A Friend to Die For (also known as Death of a Cheerleader in the UK and during subsequent Lifetime television airings) is a 1994 American psychological thriller television film directed by William A. Graham. Written by Dan Bronson, the film is based on the real-life murder of Kirsten Costas, who was killed by her classmate, Bernadette Protti, in 1984. The film was the highest-rated TV movie of 1994.

Plot
In the fictional town of Santa Mira, California, a man witnesses student Stacy Lockwood (Tori Spelling) (whom he drove home after she went to his house to telephone her parents) being stabbed by an unseen "friend", who followed them to her house. When her family arrives home, they find paramedics and police gathered outside, as Stacy is rushed to the hospital, where she dies.

In a flashback to ten months earlier, Angela Delvecchio (Kellie Martin) is a shy high school sophomore who aspires to be popular, beautiful and perfect in everything. She performs well academically in school, attends Mass regularly, and sets high goals for herself. She idolizes Stacy, who is the most popular girl at school, as well as a cheerleader. One of the reasons why Angela admires Stacy is because one of Angela's goals is to become a cheerleader. When Angela is accepted into the Larks, the school's popular clique, she tries to forge a friendship with the rich, snobbish and conceited Stacy, who rejects her. She then further suffers being rejected for a coveted position as one of the yearbook staff and in an audition for the cheerleading squad, leaving her humiliated and feeling like a failure.

The events of the night of Stacy's stabbing are shown from Angela's perspective. Still determined to be friends with Stacy, Angela calls Stacy's mother and anonymously invites her to a party under the guise of there being a special dinner for the Larks. Once Stacy gets in the car with Angela, she reveals that the "dinner" story was a lie she told Stacy's mother so she would be allowed to meet Angela. Infuriated, Stacy demands to be taken home. Angela tries to explain how much she admires Stacy and wants to be like her, which further disturbs and upsets Stacy. Stacy then runs to a nearby house, where she asks to use the telephone, explaining that the "friend" she was with had "gotten a little weird", and manages to get a ride home. Angela fears that Stacy will use this incident to humiliate her at school. She follows the car back to Stacy's home, and, in a rage, stabs Stacy multiple times and leaves her for dead.

Angela avoids capture in the weeks following the incident. Although Angela is interviewed by the police, she is not named as a suspect. Angela, along with all of the Larks, attends Stacy's Funeral Mass. Most of the students put the blame for Stacy's murder on one of their classmates, Monica Whitley (Kathryn Morris), a goth girl who was always mocked and tormented by Stacy for her appearance; she and Stacy always hated each other and she threatened to kill her. At first, no one suspects Angela because she is seemingly too nice to commit the crime. Furthermore, Jamie Hall (Marley Shelton), Angela's former best friend and one of Stacy's friends, tells Angela that she never really liked Stacy, and was only afraid of her.

As her junior year begins, Angela becomes more involved with the community, taking up such activities as peer counselling and candy striping. Overwhelmed by Stacy's murder, one of the Larks brings up the idea of disbanding. Determined not to let this happen, Angela argues that they should remain active, noting that the group was not only important to Stacy, but also to the various community activities in which they take part. This idea not only saves the Larks, but also wins Angela the position of secretary/treasurer.

In the meantime, a harassment campaign is waged against Monica until she finally leaves the school. At this point, authorities resume their investigation and begin re-interviewing possible suspects, including Angela. With the authorities slowly closing in on her, she becomes more and more consumed by her guilt, until she finally confesses to her priest and then to her parents in a letter.

Devastated by the arrest, Jamie, who had gone to St. Joseph's Catholic School with Angela prior to high school, confesses to their priest to having left her in a ski lodge alone during a ski trip the year before, all because she did not have the courage to stand up to Stacy. The high school's principal, Ed Saxe, declared Angela a "sick kid" and that there is no problem with materialism. As the trial begins, the Prosecutor argues that Angela should be charged with first-degree murder as there was evidence of premeditation. Angela's lawyer claims it was second-degree murder.

The judge agrees with the defense, after listening to Angela's taped confession. Stating that, other than the tape, the rest of the evidence was just circumstantial and that the prosecution failed to prove the crime to be premeditated. Angela is then sentenced to confinement until the age of 25. Back at the church, the priest gives a homily on the community's responsibility for the death of Stacy, stating that the unrealistic high expectations and pressures to be "perfect" contributed to Angela's actions. As the movie ends, Jamie writes a letter to Angela, explaining that she quit the Larks (having left when she realized how mean they were to Angela) and that she plans to leave Santa Mira High School and go back to her former school, St. Joseph's. Angela is released and paroled after a few years from juvenile hall.

Cast

 Kellie Martin as Angela Delvecchio
 Tori Spelling as Stacy Lockwood
 Marley Shelton as Jamie Hall
 Valerie Harper as Mrs. Delvecchio
 Margaret Langrick as Jill Anderson 
 Christa Miller as Teresa Delvecchio
 Terry O'Quinn as Principal Ed Saxe
 Andy Romano as Joe Delvecchio
 Eugene Roche as the Priest
 James Avery as Agent Gilwood
 Jenna Leigh Green as Meridith Ladd
 Brittney Powell as Head Cheerleader
 Kathryn Morris as Monica Whitley
Tom O'Rourke as Dick Lockwood
Marnie Andrews as Dana Lockwood
Robyn Bliley as Courtney Clay
 Tom Everett as Sergeant Denning (uncredited)

Home media
On March 25, 2002, the film was released on Region 2 DVD as Death of a Cheerleader.

Murder of Kirsten Costas

The film was based on the murder of Kirsten Costas. On June 23, 1984, in Orinda, California, Costas was murdered by her classmate, Bernadette Protti. Protti had been jealous of Costas, who was the daughter of affluent parents and very popular at Miramonte High School. Kirsten had been a member of the yearbook committee and a cheerleader. However, Bernadette was not accepted by the yearbook committee and tried out for cheerleading, but was not picked. Kirsten, who was chosen to be a cheerleader, saw Bernadette as a wannabe and didn't take her seriously.

On June 23, 1984, Costas was lured with a phony invitation to a dinner for the Bob-o-Links, a sorority-like group at school. According to Protti's later testimony, she had planned to take Costas to the party to befriend her, but Costas got angry when she was told that there was no dinner for the new "Bobbies". The girls quarreled, and Costas fled to the home of Alex and Mary Jane Arnold, living nearby, telling them that her friend had gone "weird". When Costas could not reach her parents by telephone, Alex Arnold drove her home, noticing that a Pinto–the Protti's family car–was following them. At the Costas home, Arnold, sitting in his car, saw Protti attack Costas. He thought that he was seeing a fist-fight but, in fact, Protti stabbed Costas five times with a kitchen knife and fled. The Costas' neighbors called an ambulance, but Kirsten was mortally wounded and died at a nearby hospital.

It took the police almost six months to find Costas' killer. After Protti passed a lie detector test, her alibi went unverified. After attempting to confirm Protti's alibi and rereading her lie detector test, the police knew that the girl had lied. After speaking with an FBI agent, Protti wrote her mother a letter in which she made a full confession.
Protti claimed to have found the kitchen knife by chance, and her older sister, Virginia, testified in court that she used to have that knife in her car to cut vegetables. The Costas did not believe this story – they claimed that nobody would use an 18-inch-long (460 mm) butcher knife to slice tomatoes and that Protti, casually dressed on that evening, never intended to take Kirsten to a party, but had planned to murder her. Protti was sentenced to a maximum of nine years but was released seven years later on parole.

The Costas family left Orinda and moved to Hawaii in 1986. Bernadette was released from prison in 1992 at the age of 23. Costas' parents vehemently opposed Protti's release.

In popular culture
 Deadly Women is a series that airs on the Investigation Discovery channel. The "Deadly Delinquents" episode featured the Bernadette Protti and Kirsten Costas murder case.
The documentary series Killer Kids also televised an episode based on the case.

Remake

In 2019, Lifetime produced a remake television film titled Death of a Cheerleader, starring Aubrey Peeples and Sarah Dugdale, with Kellie Martin also appearing.

References

External links
 
 
 TV Crime: Sky Death of a Cheerleader Lifetime Movie Based on Kirsten Costas Murder

1994 television films
1994 films
1994 crime drama films
1990s teen drama films
American crime drama films
American high school films
American psychological thriller films
American teen drama films
Cheerleading films
Drama films based on actual events
1990s English-language films
Films about bullying
Films about murderers
Films about Catholicism
Films about school violence
Films set in California
Lifetime (TV network) films
NBC network original films
Crime films based on actual events
Films directed by William Graham (director)
American drama television films
1990s American films